The Haifa metropolitan area is a metropolitan area including areas from both the Haifa and the Northern districts of Israel. It is located along the Israeli Mediterranean coastline. With an estimated population of almost 1 million, the Haifa metropolitan area is the third largest metropolitan area in Israel, behind Gush Dan and Greater Jerusalem.

Metropolitan rings

Israel Central Bureau of Statistics divides the Haifa metropolitan area into three:

Notes
 1 The population of "Jews and others" includes Jews, non-Arab Christians and those not classified by religion.
 2 The core area includes the city of Haifa.
 3 The inner ring consists of the Haifa District and includes the cities Kiryat Bialik, Kiryat Yam, Kiryat Motzkin, Kiryat Ata, Tirat Carmel and Nesher, as well as a multitude of smaller towns (local councils).
 4 The outer ring includes the cities Tamra, Karmiel, Acre, Shfar'am and Nahariya, as well as many smaller towns (local councils).

Economy

Business districts
 Downtown Haifa – the central business district of Haifa. This area has the port of Haifa, many shops and some beaches
 Bay area, Haifa – between Haifa and the Krayot. This area has some malls and businesses. This area is also an important transport center with buses to Haifa and the northern part of the country, and trains to the central and southern parts of the country
 Matam Park, Haifa – Hi-tech park in the south of the city. This park has the offices of Google, Microsoft and Yahoo! of Israel. Matam also has the IEC Tower, one of the tallest in the city
 Carmel Center neighborhood (Merkaz HaKarmel), Haifa – shops and restaurants
 Coastal strip of Haifa – from Downtown to Matam park
 HaGa'aton Boulevard, Nahariya – The main street of the city from the beaches to Highway 4. The street has shops, restaurants, some hotels and the railway and bus stations
 Coastal strip of Nahariya – some restaurants and one of northernmost coastal strips in the country
 Industrial park of Karmiel – in the east of the city

Shopping centers
Haifa
 Haifa Mall
 Grand canyon
 Lev HaMifratz Mall
 Horev center

Krayot
 HaKiryon
 Azrieli Kiryat Ata

Nahariya
 Nahariya Mall
 Kanyon HaTzafon (The north mall)

Karmiel
 Hotzot Karmiel Mall

Akko
 Azrieli Akko

Shefaram
  Shefaram mall

Transportation

The bus company Egged runs many lines within Haifa and some lines connecting Haifa with other cities in the metropolitan area. Israel's national highway network connects Haifa with other metropolitan areas, cities and suburbs. Haifa Airport serves domestics flights to Eilat and international flights to Cyprus and Greece. Israel Railways runs inter city lines to other cities in the country and one commuter line from Haifa to its northern suburbs. There are plans for two new lines to its eastern suburbs.

Major highways
The major highways in the Haifa metropolitan area include Area are:

 Highway 2 – connects Haifa with Tel Aviv.
 Highway 4 – connects all Israeli coastal plain cities and pass via Haifa city.
 Highway 75 – connects Haifa with Lower Galilee via Jezreel Valley.
 Highway 70 – connects Carmel plain with Western Galilee. 
 Highway 85 – connects Akko with Upper Galilee.
 Highway 79 – connects Krayot area with Lower Galilee.

Panoramas

See also
List of cities in Israel

References

Regions of Israel
Metropolitan areas of Israel
Geography of Haifa District
Metropolitan area
Metropolitan area
Metropolitan area